Wayne Alan Harold (born November 7, 1964) is an American independent editor, publisher and filmmaker who lives in Kent, Ohio. During his career he has formed lasting creative relationships with both Toby Radloff and P. Craig Russell.

Harold is a 1988 graduate of Kent State University with a degree in communications and film. Soon after graduating from Kent State, Harold began producing short comedic segments for MTV about Cleveland-based "genuine nerd" Toby Radloff. In the 1990s, Harold co-created the cult horror comedy feature films Killer Nerd and Bride of Killer Nerd, both of which starred Radloff. He continued working with Radloff in the 1999 cult film Townies, and then the 2006 documentary Genuine Nerd.

Harold's 2009 documentary, Night Music: The Art of P. Craig Russell, has had public screenings at the Cleveland Museum of Art and the Wexner Center for the Arts in Columbus. In 2012, he created the first volume of P. Craig Russell’s Guide to Graphic Storytelling,  an educational video series that teaches effective sequential storytelling techniques. Five follow-up volumes were subsequently produced.

Harold is the founder of the Kent Comic Arts Fest in Kent, Ohio. The debut event was held at Kent State University on October 19, 2013. Guests included P. Craig Russell, Jill Thompson and other artists of the graphic novel adaptation of Neil Gaiman's The Graveyard Book.

In 2015, he edited, designed and published the P. Craig Russell Sketchbook Archives, a hardcover coffee-table style art book featuring career-spanning sketch work by artist  P. Craig Russell.

In 2017, Harold launched a series of Fine Art Editions, featuring oversized 12"x17" Artist's Edition-type books that feature comic art pages printed the same size as the original art board (and scanned from the original art wherever possible). The initial volume in the series is P. Craig Russell's Jungle Book and Other Stories.

Filmography 
Source:

References

External links
 

American film directors
Kent State University alumni
1964 births
Living people